Pseudanthias cooperi, the red-bar anthias is a Pseudanthias fish from the Indo-Pacific Ocean that occasionally makes its way into the aquarium trade. It grows to a size of 14 cm in length.

Etymology
The identity of the person honoured in the specific name is not specified in Regan's account but it is thought to be Clive Forster Cooper (1880-1947), who was a member of the expedition on which the type was collected in the Maldives.

References

External links
 

cooperi
Taxa named by Charles Tate Regan
Fish described in 1902